Freeman Lord (1842–1917) was a member of the Wisconsin State Assembly.

Biography
Lord was born Freeman Hersie Lord on March 10, 1842 in Hancock County, Maine. He moved to Oshkosh, Wisconsin in 1851 and to Pierce County, Wisconsin in 1853. During the American Civil War, he enlisted in the 30th Wisconsin Volunteer Infantry Regiment of the Union Army. In 1886, he married Hannah E. Preble. She died in 1913. In 1916, he married Ida Mae Barney. Lord died on November 17, 1917.

Political career
Lord was elected to the Assembly in 1894 and was re-elected in 1895 and 1896. He was again elected to the Assembly in 1902. Previously, he had served as Assessor and Chairman of River Falls, Wisconsin. Lord was a Republican.

References

External links
Find a Grave
The Political Graveyard

People from Hancock County, Maine
Politicians from Oshkosh, Wisconsin
People from Pierce County, Wisconsin
Republican Party members of the Wisconsin State Assembly
People of Wisconsin in the American Civil War
Union Army soldiers
1842 births
1917 deaths
People from River Falls, Wisconsin
19th-century American politicians
Burials in Wisconsin